Mike Kemp (born December 13, 1952) is an American athletic director and former ice hockey head coach for the men's program at Omaha. After having been an associate athletic director at Omaha since 2009, he was named interim athletic director on July 16, 2021, following the departure of former AD Trev Alberts for the same position at the latter's alma mater of Nebraska.

Career
Mike Kemp began his coaching career with Division III Gustavus Adolphus, his alma mater, in 1976. After five seasons with the Golden Gusties he moved on to Wisconsin as an assistant for one season. After a year-long stint with Illinois-Chicago he returned to Madison and remained with the program for thirteen years, helping the Badgers to a national title in 1990.

In the summer of 1996 Nebraska–Omaha, who had announced the intention of sponsoring a Division I program beginning in 1997–98, hired Kemp as the team's first head coach. The Mavericks got started as an Independent and after two foreseeably poor seasons they were accepted into the CCHA in 1999. Two years into their conference experience, Kemp got the Mavericks to post their first winning season, going 24–15–3, earning a final ranking as the #13 team in the country and just narrowly missing the NCAA tournament.

After another 20+ win season the Mavericks went into the tank for a pair of years before Kemp was able to pull them out of it and get the team to hover around the .500 mark for five seasons. Kemp got the Mavericks their first berth in the tournament in 2006 with his third 20+ win season but unfortunately wasn't able to push them past #1 seed Boston University. The following offseason Kemp was offered the position of Athletic Director with the university but turned it down when he determined that he couldn't be both head coach and AD at the same time. Two years later Kemp stepped down as head coach to accept a position as associate AD, clearing the way for 2-time national champion Dean Blais to take over the program.

Kemp was inducted into the Omaha Hockey Hall of Fame in 2010.

Head caching record

References

1952 births
Living people
Gustavus Adolphus Golden Gusties men's ice hockey coaches
Omaha Mavericks men's ice hockey coaches
UIC Flames men's ice hockey coaches
Wisconsin Badgers men's ice hockey coaches
Sportspeople from Duluth, Minnesota
Ice hockey people from Minnesota
American ice hockey coaches
Ice hockey coaches from Minnesota